Kim Böling (born 4 February 1992) is a Finnish professional footballer who plays as a midfielder for Kakkonen club Närpes Kraft.

References

External links
 

1992 births
Living people
People from Närpes
Finnish footballers
Vaasan Palloseura players
Veikkausliiga players
Närpes Kraft Fotbollsförening players
Association football forwards
Sportspeople from Ostrobothnia (region)